Malori is an Italian name. Notable people and fictional characters with the name include:

Adriano Malori (born 1988), Italian cyclist
Lorenzo Malori (1724–1830), Italian centenarian
Malori "Mal" Crowett, a character in Mage & Demon Queen

Italian-language surnames